John Graham (1774–1844) was a Church of Ireland clergyman, a senior officer of the Orange Order, and a prolific author of poetic and historical works. He opposed Catholic Emancipation and was for more than two decades a prominent champion of the Protestant cause in Ireland.

Early life and Church appointments
He was the eldest son of James and Anne (née Hart) Graham of Clones, County Monaghan, born in the parish of Shruel, County Longford, on 21 April 1774. Educated at Trinity College, Dublin, he joined both the College’s corps of yeomanry and the recently formed Orange Institution, graduating in July 1798, the year of the United Irishmen’s uprising. In August he set out from Dublin to be ordained at Killala but, finding that district occupied by French insurgents, he joined a troop of dragoons and remained in active service until on 9 September he "saw by the light of the rising sun on the ensanguined field of Ballynamuck the dead bodies of seven hundred Irish rebels and the entire of their French allies prisoner". Returning to Dublin, he was ordained a priest of the Church of Ireland on 24 February 1799.

He held successive curacies in Kilrush, County Clare, and the Ulster parishes of Maghera, Tamlaght O’Crilly and Lifford, until in 1824 he was appointed Rector of Tamlaghtard, otherwise Magilligan, where he remained until his death twenty years later. While at Lifford he was inspector of the local gaol and kept a school where his pupils included James MacCullagh, future Fellow of the Royal Society and recipient of its Copley Medal. Visiting Graham in 1822, Dr Thomas Reid found he had charge of Lifford’s lunatic asylum and was "fraught with information on almost every topic ... and distinguished for learning and talents of the first order". Reid recorded his surprise that, after twenty-three years as a curate, this "excellent individual" had yet to be rewarded with his own parish. Five years earlier Earl Whitworth, the Lord Lieutenant, had regretted the lack of opportunity to give Graham the preferment he desired.

Graham considered the faith of the Church of Ireland was "in sum and substance" the same as that practised in Ireland from the sixth century until Roman Catholicism arrived from England in the twelfth. As a boy of fourteen he had witnessed the centenary celebrations of the Apprentice Boys’ closure of the gates of Londonderry against the army of the Catholic James II, a key moment in the conflict which brought eventual victory to William of Orange. Graham believed the proper legacy of the Orange victory should be the expulsion of Popery from Ireland and comprehensive restoration of the faith established there a millennium earlier. Supremacy for Protestantism and respect for the Orange achievement were the mainsprings of his life’s work.

Early literary work
His early writing concerned social, economic and topographical matters and was first published in 1808 as part of Hely Dutton’s Statistical Survey of the County of Clare. Dutton’s preface included the observation that the Survey would have been a superior publication if uniform in quality with John Graham’s contributions.

Commencing in 1813, he produced detailed accounts of the parishes of Maghera and Shruel and of the Kilrush Union for William Shaw Mason’s three-volume Statistical Survey of Ireland, and in 1823-25 he contributed the chronological section of the Statistical Account of the City and County of Londonderry and the Counties of Tyrone and Donegal published in the North West of Ireland Society’s Magazine. For this latter work he was made an Honorary Member of the Society and presented with a gift of silver plate.

From 1816 onward he wrote a series of articles entitled "Annals of Irish Popery by John De Falkirk", tracing Ireland’s ecclesiastical, civil and military history from 1535 to 1691. These appeared in the Dublin Journal and were subsequently published in collected form to counter what Graham described as Denis Taaffe’s "false and traitorous History of Ireland" of which a compendium had been circulated "when the true reformed faith of this realm was assailed by the Popish demagogues of Ireland".

During the same period he composed numerous poems and ballads, examples of which regularly appeared (generally anonymously though often credited as originating in Lifford) in the Anti-Jacobin Review and sometimes reached a wider audience in the columns of newspapers and journals such as the Morning Post, The Sun, and the Gentleman's Magazine.

Increasingly his work contained material hostile to "the Romish persuasion" and Catholic emancipation. Sometimes this was expressed in verse but it also appeared in argumentative tracts such as his 1820 Defence of the Orange Society in Ireland and in articles written for The Warder under the pseudonym "An Apprentice Boy".

These works were praised by Sir Harcourt Lees, who lamented that his own writing in protest at Jesuit political activity in Ireland was "unsupported except by the Rev. John Graham, the learned but humble Curate of Lifford". In 1823, at the request of the Editor of the Dublin Evening Herald, Graham wrote "Sir Harcourt’s Vision, An Historical Poem", containing a fictional account of Lees returning to his grotto at Howth and having a vision of various post-1641 historical scenes. Graham subsequently had this printed in 14-page booklet form.

Conversely, Graham’s writing attracted the vitriol of the poet Thomas Furlong, an advocate of Catholic Emancipation who dubbed him "crazy Graham", dismissed his poetry as "vile doggerel" and "ribald rhymes", and enjoined his readers to "mark how he stoops laboriously to drain the last low oozings of his muddy brain".

Derriana
In 1823 he published Derriana, being an account of the siege of Londonderry and defence of Enniskillen in 1688-89. Sometimes referred to as the New Derriana it succeeded another Derriana, compiled by George Douglas in 1794, which had reproduced early accounts of the siege and related matters. Graham wove these accounts into a single diary of the events of 1688-89 incorporating dialogue excerpts from an "old historical dramatisation" of such events (traditionally ascribed to Colonel John Mitchelburne) and adding his own lyrical catalogue of significant figures in the siege (based on an ancient poem discovered at Armagh) with accompanying biographical notes on the individuals named.

Imprisonment
By the time of his appointment to Magilligan, Graham was widely known as a senior member of the Orange Order, and he was soon called "Orange Graham" or "the Orange Rector" by locals hostile to his sympathies. Over a period of months prior to February 1826 his family and servants were repeatedly disturbed late at night by sounds of fife music and of footsteps passing and re-passing his glebe-house. Graham and his sons eventually confronted a party of men engaged in the disturbance, Graham snatching the fife from its player and pistol-whipping three of the party. He was accused and convicted of assault, for which he was sentenced to one month’s imprisonment and bound over to keep the peace for three years.

While he was imprisoned, an "immense number" of intruders entered upon his glebe and pitched tents there for the purposes of holding a so-called "ribbon fair" (an event supposedly organised by Ribbonmen). The police were summoned and, after a long stand-off, were attacked. Four of the attackers, including the owner of the fife seized by Graham, were subsequently sentenced to a year’s imprisonment. One report of the matter implied that local hostility towards Graham followed his exposure of the "kissing priest", a Catholic clergyman in Magilligan accused of attempting to seduce the wife of a parishioner while she knelt in confession before him.

Orange Order and political activities
He was Chaplain (sometimes styled Senior Grand Chaplain) of the Orange Institution by January 1820 and was reappointed as such, reportedly "for the nineteenth time", in 1838. In 1825 he was elected Grand Master of the Grand Orange Lodge of the City and County of Londonderry and was still such in 1842, the position giving him considerable influence over district lodges in the county, which in 1831 numbered 120 with an approximate total membership of 17,000. In 1829 he presided when the Orangemen of Tyrone, Donegal and Londonderry met together, and in 1832 he was said to be "now the Father of the Orangemen of Ireland". Following dissolution of the Grand Lodge of Ireland in 1844 he was elected first Master of the Grand Lodge of Ulster, but died within a month of his election.

In 1830 the Londonderry Sentinel reported "general belief" that Graham had identified himself with Orangeism as a means to preferment within his church and had expected nothing less than a bishopric if the Duke of York, Grand Master of the Order, became king. If such had ever been Graham’s design, by 1830 his Orange connection spoke more plausibly of his "willingness to renounce high prospects". At his death his association with the Order was said to have been "distinguished for his uncompromising principles and for the wholesome spirit of religious confidence which he infused into Its councils", and he was remembered for "increasing the use of his influence with the Orangemen to preserve them from infringing in the least the laws" by which their activities had become circumscribed.

It was Graham’s representation of the general Protestant rather than the particular Orange interest that brought him the civic recognition evident when his health and work were regularly toasted at anniversary celebrations of the Shutting of the Gates of Derry. In 1827 the toast was proposed by Sir George Hill, Member of Parliament (MP) for the city, who declared that Graham had "for a series of years back, been reckless of selfish considerations, devoted his time and his talents to the maintenance of the Protestant interest, and possessed a strong claim on the gratitude of the citizens of Londonderry". Hill had just proposed the health of George Robert Dawson, MP for County Londonderry, who like Hill had promised implacable opposition to Catholic emancipation and had benefited from Graham’s energetic support at elections. But in the following year Dawson turned coat and helped pave the way for passing of the Roman Catholic Relief Act 1829, which Graham regarded as the moment "the sun of England’s glory went down".

Graham met Dawson’s apostasy with venom. He perambulated Derry’s streets in a dogcart with a dead rodent labelled "Rat Dawson" suspended from it and commenced a vigorous campaign to prevent Dawson’s re-election. Recognising the hopelessness of his position, Dawson resigned the Londonderry seat in July 1830 and looked elsewhere for a constituency. Graham’s exertions won him the admiration of Dublin’s Common Councilmen who voted him the freedom of their city — which was withheld on the intervention of its Board of Aldermen (the Commons retaliating by blocking the Aldermanic nomination of Archdeacon Thomas Singleton).

When the poll for the County Londonderry Election opened in August 1830, a procession of 400 mounted freeholders entered Derry to cast their votes, Graham riding at their head "on a white charger and bearing a wand". An element of theatre seems to have attended his later political appearances. In February 1831, "with William the Third set in gold suspended from his neck by an Orange collar", he took control of a public meeting in Coleraine, pulling a respected local figure from his platform and knocking off the man’s hat. He then mounted the platform where he allegedly "danced, pranced, made signs and grimaces". Acquitted on a charge of assault resulting from this affair, he was shortly afterwards reported as behaving, at an election meeting in the Court House in Derry, in a manner "indescribably ludicrous and pantomimical" and "affording a triumph to the impugners of Protestantism by his wretched buffoonery".

Later publications
During the 1820s, Graham was a prolific author of verse. This was composed, he said, "in the leisure hours of a life actively engaged in the defence of the Protestant religion and constitution of the realm", and his conduct of politics through poetry found space in both metropolitan and provincial English newspapers in compositions such as "Roman Catholic emancipation: a warning voice to the people of England". In 1829 a 368-page collection of his poetry was published as Poems, Chiefly Historical, dedicated to Lord Kenyon, Deputy Grand Master of the Orange Society, and containing "specimens of almost every kind of English Versification - the Italian stanza of Spenser, the Heroic Lines of Goldsmith, the Hudibrastics of Butler, and the Peter Pindarics of Lord Byron, with a great variety of Lyric measure, adapted to the music of popular Sonnets".

In 1829 there also appeared his A History of the Siege of Derry and Defence of Enniskillen, in the year 1688 and 1689, being a second edition of Derriana, and he advertised for subscription a proposed history of the City of Londonderry and North-West District of Ireland covering the period 1689-1829. The proposed book did not materialise but some of its intended content reached print in the series of articles "Desiderata Curiosa Derriana", which he wrote (under the pseudonym "Statisticus") for the Londonderry Sentinel and Londonderry Standard in 1840-43.

1839 saw the publication of his A History of Ireland: From The Relief of Londonderry in 1689 to the Surrender of Limerick in 1691. He intended that this should form part of a four-volume History of Ireland, the remaining three volumes to consist of new editions of Annals and Derriana and other material he had "in readiness". Two years later came Ireland Preserved, in which he reworked Mitchelburne’s "old historical drama" (from which he had borrowed in 1823) and Robert Ashton’s Battle of Aughrim, revised the lyrical catalogue from Derriana, and expanded the related biographical notes.

Parish and domestic matters
Although Graham’s annual income at Magilligan was £300 or more, he lived modestly: "he never furnished his glebe-house except with the worthless furniture which he had when a curate and his personal habits were always the most simple and frugal". But he was "hospitable beyond his means", gave generously for widows and orphans, travelled frequently, and personally bore the costs of initiatives such as his relentless prosecution of Father Boyle, the Catholic priest in Magilligan, for officiating at the marriage of a Catholic and a Protestant who, contrary to an Act of 1725, had not previously been married by the Church of Ireland. In consequence, at his death he was said to leave no more to his family than "the great principles of the Protestant religion".

In 1842, when a letter appeared in the press suggesting he neglected his parish, the Bishop of Derry was promptly presented with an address signed by 134 members of Graham’s Church of Ireland congregation attesting to his reliability as a minister in every respect and to his care for the poor of all denominations. This was accompanied by a letter signed by 100 Roman Catholics from within the parish, praising his courtesy and kindness and saying there had been no clergyman of any persuasion more constantly present among them.

His relationship with the Presbyterian community seems to have passed unrecorded, beyond it being said that he displayed "a growing zeal for unity and harmony amongst the Protestants of Ireland".

Death, memorial and family
Graham died at Magilligan on 9 March 1844 and was buried in the churchyard there. In 1856, twelve years having elapsed without a stone being placed over his grave, an appeal was made for funds to erect a suitable memorial to him. The conduct of the appeal and implementation of its objective were slow, and in 1861 Graham’s tomb was still incomplete. In response to criticism, the trustees of the project passed to Magilligan’s new rector a sum regarded as sufficient for completion, retaining the surplus to put up a proposed tablet to Graham’s memory in St Columb's Cathedral. A further appeal for funds was made in the latter connection and raised some sixty or seventy pounds. However, in 1863 the tomb remained unfinished, its foundation had given way, and no tablet for Graham had been erected in the Cathedral. In the 1870s, the funds in hand were applied to the cost of various installations in the Apprentice Boys’ Memorial Hall in Derry, including a mural tablet for Graham in the upper assembly room.

Graham had married Elizabeth Johnson of Carrigaholt, County Clare, in 1802. Robert Young’s "Song, on hearing Mrs Elizabeth Graham play the piano surrounded by her family" was printed in The Orange Minstrel of 1832. She died on 7 March 1845. The couple had numerous children, the youngest being born in 1832, thirty years after their marriage.

Their eldest son, Rev. James Graham (1804–45), was appointed his father’s curate at Magilligan in 1827 and was a Deputy Grand Chaplain of the Orange Order. He was later Clerical Secretary of the non-denominational Society for Promoting the Education of the Poor in Ireland (otherwise known as the Kildare Park Society) before becoming Senior Curate of St Columb's Cathedral, Londonderry. He was the father of the noted Victorian journalist Charlotte Eliza Humphry.

John Graham’s younger sons included Rev. Richard Graham (1807–76) who died while a chaplain at Chaguanas, Trinidad, where he was noted for his eccentricity and charitable acts, and William Graham (1811–58) who was admitted a Member of the Royal College of Surgeons in 1833. The latter was ship’s doctor on board the Hannah when she struck ice in the Gulf of Saint Lawrence in 1849; he broke an ankle attempting to prevent the ship’s captain leaving the stricken vessel and suffered serious frostbite before being rescued. Contrary to some reports, he recovered and returned to Ireland, where he became "a sottish drunkard" and led "a precarious vagrant existence" until his death in Londonderry Lunatic Asylum.

Legacy
Graham’s accounts of the Williamite War in Ireland are of enduring importance, because he researched the subject at a time when there existed written records and oral traditions that have since been lost. As early as 1829, an Irish commentator observed that he had "rescued from oblivion important facts of our general and local history, long buried among nearly forgotten records of our country and which but for his indefatigable research must have been lost to posterity". And in 1861 it was doubted that the Siege of Derry "would ever have supplied the magnificent episode devoted to the subject in Macaulay’s History had the labours of the humble Rector of Tamlaghtard not gone before to facilitate the researches and kindle the enthusiasm of the noble historian".

In Graham’s lifetime he was recognised as "the Poet Laureate of the Northern Orangemen",
The popularity of his anthems in the mid-19th century is recorded, for instance, in the Preface to William Shannon’s The United Empire Minstrel, while David O'Donoghue later called him "the best of the Orange poets". His Orange sympathies and the sectarian character of many of his ballads resulted in his skill with rhyme and rhythm being rejected by many of his contemporaries and overlooked by subsequent generations.

In 1861 the Londonderry Sentinel opined that his works would "hereafter hold a place incomparably beyond any accorded to them during his lifetime", and when, in 1892, his Poems, Chiefly Historical, were republished under the title Loyal Lays of Ancient Derry, they were promoted with the recommendation that "In years to come when ancient forms of party strife have died out they will take their place in Irish literature beside the National Ballads". Perhaps such predictions still await their ultimate fulfilment.

Notes

External links
Text of Graham's poem "An Epistle to Lord Byron"
Links to other poems by Graham

References

1774 births
1844 deaths
Irish poets
Church of Ireland clergy
Protestantism in Ireland
History of Catholicism in the United Kingdom
History of Ireland (1801–1923)
History of Catholicism in Ireland
History of Christianity in the United Kingdom
People from County Longford
History of Derry (city)
Fredericton